Actio Curiosa is a Hungarian play by an unknown author. It was first produced in 1678. The title is Latin, meaning "Strange Play".

References 

Hungarian plays

1678 plays
Works published anonymously